Hasnuryadi Sulaiman is an Indonesian businessman and politician.

Hasnuryadi is a son of H. Abdussamad Sulaiman, the founder of Barito Putera and Hasnur Group, also the public figure from Banjarmasin. He is also a commissioner of Hasnur Group (mining, forestry, agribusiness, and media corporation).

Career 
Commissioner of Hasnur Group
 Elder of Hasnur Centre Foundation
 Owner of Barito Putera
Member of DPR-RI from Golkar Party
Exco member of PSSI

References

External links 
 

1975 births
Living people
Deakin University alumni
Golkar politicians
Indonesian businesspeople
People from South Kalimantan
PS Barito Putera